The Actual may refer to:

 The Actual (band), an American pop rock group
 The Actual (novel), a novel by Saul Bellow
 "The Actual" (song), a song by All City